Sibirsky is a rural locality (a settlement) in Gnilovskoye Rural Settlement, Ostrogozhsky District, Voronezh Oblast, Russia. The population was 54 as of 2010. There are 2 streets.

Geography 
Sibirsky is located 14 km southwest of Ostrogozhsk (the district's administrative centre) by road. Novaya Melnitsa is the nearest rural locality.

References 

Rural localities in Ostrogozhsky District